Krishna Ella is an Indian scientist and entrepreneur. He is the founder and chairman of Bharat Biotech where he is also a Managing Director. Ella and his company were responsible for developing India's own COVID-19 vaccine, Covaxin.

Ella worked as a research faculty at the Medical University of South Carolina in Charleston after earning his Ph.D. from the University of Wisconsin-Madison.

Early life and education

Krishna Ella was born into a Telugu-speaking Hindu family in the Tiruttani village, in the Tiruvallur district of Tamil Nadu, South India in 1969.

Ella obtained a bachelor's degree from the Tamil Nadu Agricultural University and joined for a Master's degree at the University of Agricultural Sciences, Bangalore. On a Rotary fellowship, he completed his master's degree from University of Hawaii. He attained his PhD from University of Wisconsin-Madison in the department of plant pathology.

Career

Ella started off his career by joining the pharmaceutical and life sciences company Bayer, as part of its agricultural division. However, he left to the United States to pursue his education.

He returned to India and set up a small lab in Hyderabad, Bharat Biotech.

In 1996, he suggested to the then Chief Minister of Andhra Pradesh, N. Chandrababu Naidu to set up a biotech knowledge park (now called Genome Valley).

Ella's company is the first to manufacture a preservative-free vaccine (Revac-B mcf Hepatitis B Vaccine), and launch India's first cell-cultured Swine Flu vaccine. They also manufacture the world's cheapest Hepatitis vaccines. Bharat Biotech is the first in the world to find a vaccine for the Zika virus. Bharat Biotech has delivered over 4 billion vaccines in 123 countries.

The vaccine against Covid developed by Bharat Biotech named as Covaxin was endorsed by Indian government with an active push by the Indian Prime minister, Narendra Modi. Covaxin usage was opposed by various opposition parties in India by terming it as BJP vaccine and Some states such as Chhattisgarh, Punjab and Kerala were hesitant to use it. However, the efficacy of Covaxin against the Delta and Omicron variants made it more acceptable afterwards. Later, Krishna Ella along with Adar Poonawalla of Serum Institute of India lauded the Prime Minister Modi for a never-seen before Government-Industry collaboration and for the vision and dynamic leadership of the Prime Minister.

Awards
 ET Now — Special Recognition for Healthcare Industry Award
 JRD Tata awards — Best Entrepreneur of the Year (2012) 
 Marico Innovation Award
 University of Southern California—Asia-Pacific Leadership Award
 BioAsia - Genome Valley excellence award (2021)
 Padma Bhushan for his contribution in Covaxin in response to COVID-19, by the Government of India in 2022.
 University of Wisconsin-Madison — Distinguished Alumni Award (2011)
 University of Wisconsin-Madison — Honorary Doctor of Science degree (2022)

References 

1969 births
Living people
Telugu people
Indian Hindus
Indian scientists
Medical University of South Carolina faculty
21st-century Indian businesspeople
University of Hawaiʻi alumni
People from Tiruvallur district
Indian chief executives
Indian businesspeople in the pharmaceutical industry
Recipients of the Padma Bhushan in trade and industry
University of Wisconsin–Madison alumni
People from Tamil Nadu